National Chung Cheng University (CCU) is a national university in Minxiong Township, Chiayi County, Taiwan. CCU is a member of the Association to Advance Collegiate Schools of Business.

History
National Chung Cheng University was the first public university established after Taiwan's economic boom of the 1980s.  In 1986, in order to promote research and to develop higher education in the Yunlin, Chiayi and Tainan areas, the government approved a plan to establish a strongly research-oriented university in Chiayi. It was named after Chiang Kai-shek and officially founded on July 1, 1989.  Lin Ching-Jiang (林清江) served as its first president.

Faculties
CCU is organized into seven colleges: Education, Engineering, Humanities, Law, Management, Sciences, and Social Sciences.  The National Chung Cheng University Library is located on the Minxiong campus.

Ranking

The QS World University Rankings (2022) placed it at 801-1000th worldwide. Meanwhile, CCU ranked 1376th in the world (2022) in the Webometrics Ranking of World Universities. USNEWS (2023) placed CCU 1705th in the world.

In popular culture
CCU is notable for being the filming location of the Taiwanese television drama Meteor Garden.

See also
 List of universities in Taiwan

References

External links

National Chung Cheng University

 
1989 establishments in Taiwan
Educational institutions established in 1989
Universities and colleges in Taiwan
Universities and colleges in Chiayi
Comprehensive universities in Taiwan